This is a list of television programs currently or formerly broadcast on Nickelodeon's preschool block, Nick Jr. from 1988 to 2009 and since 2014 under its current name, 2009 to 2012 under the Nick Play Date name, and 2012 to 2014 under the Nick: The Smart Place to Play name.

Current programming
 1 Also aired on Nick Jr. on CBS/Nick on CBS.

Original programming

Acquired programming

Upcoming programming

Original programming

Acquired programming

Former programming

Original programming

Acquired programming

Programming from Nickelodeon

Programming from Noggin

Short-form programming

Mascots

Notes

References 

Nick Jr.
Lists of television series by network
Nickelodeon original programming
 
Nickelodeon-related lists